Haunted Live is an American paranormal television series that premiered on September 14, 2018 in the United States on Travel Channel. The series features the Tennessee Wraith Chasers, a group of paranormal investigators who are famous for trying to "trap ghosts" during their investigations. This time, TWC are joined by viewers around the country who participate in live-on-air paranormal investigations through social media. The show initially aired on Fridays at 10 p.m. EST.

Premise

With Jesse Blaze Snider as their host in the first two episodes, hosting duty continued with Jamie Kaler, viewers participate in a live interactive ghost hunts via social media as the Tennessee Wraith Chasers (TWC) need their help to investigate some of the most haunted locations in America. James McDaniel was in charge of the social media command center where all the live-streaming cameras and feeds were used during the viewers findings online.

During their live, unfiltered investigations, TWC perform various experiments to capture proof of paranormal activity while fans watch video feed streaming live to help lead the team to different areas needed for further investigation through Travel Channel's Facebook page. Afterwards, there is a Q&A sessions with TWC where fans can chat about their own findings.

Opening introduction:

Cast
Tennessee Wraith Chasers:

Chris Smith
Steven "Doogie" McDougal
Scott Porter
Brannon Smith 
Mike Goncalves

Guest member:
Angel Leigh - 'spiritual messenger' (Episode 1.2)

Episodes

See also
Ghost hunting
Apparitional experience
Parapsychology

References

External links

Tennessee Wraith Chasers

Paranormal reality television series
2010s American documentary television series
2010s American reality television series
2018 American television series debuts
English-language television shows